Of the different branches of Cossacks, the only one that documents allowing Jews into their society were the Cossacks of Ukraine.

Changes of sentiment during the 17th century
When Poland and Lithuania were merged by King Sigismund Augustus into one commonwealth (in the Union of Lublin of 1569) the provinces of Volhynia, Podilia and the rest of Ukraine were separated from the Grand Duchy of Lithuania and came under the direct rule of Poland. The Zaporozhian Cossacks were generally indifferent to religious matters and bore no particular ill will toward the Jews up to the time of Hetman Nalyvaiko.  They often included religious Jews among their company, but after the Union of Brest Mazur immigration introduced a negative feeling against the Jews from Poland to Ukraine during the reign of Sigismund III (1587–1632), and Cossacks wanted to baptize Jews now. The guilds that were established, which always feared the competition of the Jews, played a prominent part in connection with various accusations. The higher nobility, however, depended largely on some part of Jews to act as their leaseholders-arendators, agents, and financial managers, and this served in a significant measure as a bar to persecution.

Historical records

Cossack society was ethnically diverse and some Cossacks may have had their origins as far away as Scotland. Maxym Kryvonis was a mercenary soldier from Scotland. Ivan Pidkova was from Moldavia. Jews also served in the ranks of the Cossacks, although the mechanism of their entry into the Cossack ranks is unclear. The Cossack regiments in Ukraine served administrative purposes, besides military, and had constant demand for able administrators, educated diplomats and scribes. Jews could fulfill those tasks because of their level of literacy and command of several languages. Although the Cossacks were not known for religiosity   before the 17th century, it is presumed that conversion was a requirement for promotion in the Cossack ranks by the early 17th century. In 1681, Ahmad Kalga, chief councilor of the Khan of Crimea, complained to the Polish ambassador, Piasaczinski, that the Cossacks of the Lower Dnieper had attacked Crimea. Piasaczinski replied that the Cossacks were not subjects of the king of Poland, and that he therefore could not be held responsible for the "acts of uncontrollable rovers of the desert that were apostates from all faiths, Poles, Muscovites, Wallachians, Turks, Tatars, Jews, etc., among them".

The responsa of Joel Särkes discusses "Berakha the Hero", who fought in the ranks of Petro Sahaidachny's Cossacks and fell in battle against the Muscovites. The deposition of Berakha's fellow-cossack "Joseph son of Moses" in the rabbinical court-case of Berakha's widow's permission to remarry states that there were at least 11 Jews in the cossack ranks of the Sahaidachny army in the battle in which Berakha was killed. In 1637, Ilyash (Elijah) Karaimovich was one of the officers of the registered Cossacks, and became their "starosta" (elder) after the execution of Pavlyuk. Karaimovich is presumed to be born a Karaim (a Turkic ethnic group adherent to Karaite Judaism.)

In 1594, a Jew known only by his first name Moses served as a deputy to Stanislav Khlopitsky, the Cossack emissary to the court of Emperor Rudolph II. Both Khlopitsky and Moses took oath on the Cossack Host's behalf in their treaty with the Emperor.
Historian of the Cossacks Yuri Mytsyk describes a case in which, in 1602, a Jew from the town of Berestye converted to Christianity and joined Zaporozhian Host. His children and property were seized by the qahal, and he had to apply to king Sigismund III for assistance in restitution of his children and property. His quest was successful, and his children joined him.

Saul Borovoy

In the 1930s, a cache containing a large number of documents written in Hebrew and Ukrainian written in Hebrew script was found by the historian and linguist Saul Borovoy (ru) in the archives of the Zaporozhian Sich. Kept at the State Archive in Moscow since the razing of the Sich by General Peter Tekeli in 1775, the documents dealt with foreign and fiscal policies of the Sich, and evidenced not only the presence of (presumably converted) Jews in the upper stratum of the Cossack society (at least 4 are mentioned by name in the Borovoy dissertation), but also in the regiments as well.

The Sich Archive became the basis of Borovoy's 1940 tripartite doctoral dissertation. Parts I and II were published in 1940 in Leningrad and 1941 in Moscow respectively. Borovoy could not return to this subject in the post-War anti-semitic climate in Soviet Union, and the 3rd part of his dissertation was never printed and the typographic sets already assembled were destroyed. Borovoy's articles on the subject first came under attack from the anti-Semitic circles in Soviet academia, because his research refuted the label of cowardice and timidity commonly applied to the Jews by the anti-Semites. Borovoy demonstrated that Jewish society in Poland became polarized due to a large stratum of destitute Jews that were marginalized by the Qahal, and these Jews were likely to lapse and seek their fortunes with the Cossacks. Later Borovoy was criticized by some Jewish circles unwilling to admit the class-related antagonism that made possible Jewish presence on the Cossacks' side.

During the 18th century
There are many known instances of Jews joining Cossacks in the era that preceded the Destruction of Sich in 1775. One notable case is Simon Chernyavsky who was baptised at the Sich in 1765. He later served as the Sich emissary to the court of Empress Catherine II. Moisey Gorlinsky served the Sich as an interpreter, and Ivan Kovalevsky (who was already baptised prior to his arrival at the Sich) reached the rank of a colonel. Some Jews joined cossacks as teenage fortune seekers, one such was Vasyl Perekhryst, son of Aizik, who joined the Host in 1748. Another Jew received exactly the same surname in baptism at the Sich two years later. Ivan Perekhryst was abducted with his entire heder class during a Cossack raid in 1732. Yakov Kryzhanovsky became a Cossack before 1768, he also  served as a deacon at the Sich church. He was literate in many languages, and distinguished himself under the command of Petro Kalnyshevsky during the Russo-Turkish War of 1769-1774.

In folklore
Jewish Encyclopedia writes that in the Ukrainian epics known as dumys there is a reference made to a polkovnyk named Matviy Borokhovych (1647), whose family name may be read as "son of Baruch" and hence may indicate his Jewish origin. In fact, there is a real 17th century polkovnyk . A Matviy Borokhovych was also among the leaders of the Khmelnytsky Uprising.

Cossack surnames of Jewish origin
Susanna Luber's study of registration books of the Registered Cossacks contain many surnames that indicate Jewish origin. Cossack families of Jewish origin  include Hertzyk, Osypov-Perekhrest, Perekhryst, Kryzhanovsky, Markevych/Markovych, Zhydenko, Zhydok, Zhydovynov, Leibenko, Yudin, Yudaev, Khalayev, Nivrochenko, Matsunenko, Shabatny, Zhydchenkov, Shafarevich, Marivchuk, Magerovsky, Zrayitel' and others.

The Israilovsky Regiment

In December 1787, Prince Potemkin, Catherine the Great's favourite and minister, founded a regiment of Jewish Cossacks for the purpose of liberating Jerusalem—the culmination of his philo-Semitism.

The first partition of Poland in 1772 had brought large numbers of Jews into the Russian empire. Catherine granted Potemkin a huge estate, named Krichev, in the newly acquired lands. Potemkin thus came into contact with Jews for the first time. Potemkin was embarking on the task of populating the empty southern steppes around the Black Sea with settlers, and he immediately tried to attract Jews from both Poland and the Mediterranean to his new settlements, in particular those Jews that were active in viticulture. He resettled these Jews in empty smallholdings left by the Zaporozhians. He also gathered around him a coterie of rabbis with whom he would discuss theology.

One in particular, Joshua Zeitlin, a wealthy merchant and scholar, became his close friend. "The two men - consort of the Russian Empress and rabbi in yamulka and ringlets - would ride together chatting amicably. Zeitlin 'walked with Potemkin like a brother and friend'. He achieved a position that no practising Jew in Russia has ever achieved before or since, remaining proudly unassimilated, steeped in rabbinical learning and piety, yet standing high in the Prince's court. Potemkin promoted Zeitlin to 'court counsellor' with a title of  nobility. Russian Jews called him 'HaSar Zeitlin' (lord Zeitlin)."

After discussions with Zeitlin and his perambulant rabbis about the fighting prowess of the Biblical Israelites, the Prince decided to arm the Jews. Potemkin had raised a Jewish cavalry squadron on his estate. When the Russo-Turkish War started, he wanted to liberate Constantinople for the Orthodox Church, and he supported the idea of helping the Jews liberate Jerusalem. 

Potemkin founded the Israelovsky Regiment of Jewish Cossacks. They were commanded by a German, Duke Ferdinand of Brunswick. The Prince de Ligne, doyen of 18th-century cosmopolitanism and a philo—Semite wrote: 'Prince Potemkin formed the singular project of raising a regiment of Jews,' he wrote to his master, the Habsburg emperor Joseph II. 'He intends to make Cossacks of them. Nothing amused me more.'

Soon two squadrons of Jewish Cossacks were on patrol against the Turks, but Ligne claimed that they were not a success. After seven months' training, he sadly decided to end his rare experiment.

This matter remains controversial, since no documents to corroborate the Potemkin regiment are present in the State Military Archive in Moscow.

It has been suggested that some of the Jewish Cossacks followed Colonel Berek Joselewicz and joined Napoleon's Polish cavalry formations. Joselewicz was killed in a night ambush by the Hungarians during Napoleon's 1809 campaign.  It has been suggested that there were veterans of the Potemkin's regiment fighting for the Emperor at some of his most celebrated victories.

Jewish Polish Cossacks
The great Polish poet Adam Mickiewicz helped to form another regiment of Jewish Cossacks, Hussars of Israel, to fight against the Russian Empire, alongside Britain, France and Turkey, in the Crimean War. These lancers fought alongside dissident Cossacks against the Russians outside Sevastopol.

Civil War in Russia

During the Civil War (1918–1920) that ensued after the Russian Revolution of 1917 many Jews served both  in the Red Cossacks (Красное Казачество), cavalry regiments of the Red Army, and in the White Cossacks. One such regiment of Red Cossacks in the Kotovsky Brigade was commanded by the anarchist Sholom Schwartzbard.  On the other hand, Jewish students also played an important role in the battalion of White Don Cossacks led by Vasily Chernetsov, so that a whole regiment of the battalion was called the “Jewish Legion”.  The Chernetsov Cossacks (Chernetsovtsy) gained prominence by initiating armed resistance against Bolsheviks in the Don area.

See also

 Khazar hypothesis of Cossack ancestry

References

Sources
 Евреи-казаки в начале XVII в. // Киевская старина. – 1890. – № 5. – С. 377-379. 
 Iokhvodova, A. "Jewish Zaporozhians and the Hadjibey Fortress" Vestnik 
 Borovoy, S. «Евреи в Запорожской Сечи (по материалам сечевого архива)» («Исторический сборник», Л., 1934, т. 1) 
 Kostomarov, M. Ruina, istoricheskaia monografiia iz zhizni Malorossii 1663–1687 gg. (The Ruin: A Historical Monograph on the Life of Little Russia from 1663 to 1687, 1st edn in Vestnik Evropy, nos 4–9 [1879] and nos 7–9 [1880]),
 Schreiber, M. The Shenhold Jewish encyclopedia (3rd edition), N.Y. 2002
 Dr. Serhii Plokhy. The Cossacks and Religion in Early Modern Ukraine. Oxford University Press 2001
 Jewish Encyclopedia - Cossacks
 Jewish Zaporozhians 
 Montefiore, Simon Sebag "Kosher cossacks". The Spectator. Sep 9, 2000
 Kosher Cossacks
 Головний Apxiв давніх  актів у Варшаві. - Ф. «Apxiв Замойських». - № 3048. - p. 286.: «Mycyk J. Zyd na Siczi Zaporoskej w XVII w. // Biulatyn Zudowskego Instytutu Istorycznego w Polsce. - Warszawa, 1993. - p. 65-66.
 Horn M. Powinnosci wojenne zydow w Rzeczy Potpolitej w XVI, XVII wieku. - Warszawa, 1978.
- p. 103.
 Luber S. Die Herkunft von Zaporoger Kozaken des 17 Jahrhunderts nach personennamen. Berlin, 1983. - p. 100.
 Архив Юго-Западной России. - Киев., 1914. - Ч. III. - Т.4. - № 45. - p. 100-102.
 Січинський В. Чужинці про Україну. - К., 1992. - p. 99-100.
 Центральний держащий історичний apxiв України в Києві). - Ф. 229. - On. I. - № 232. - Арк. 199.
 Лиман І. I. Церква в духовному cвіті Запорозького козацтва. - Запоріжжя, 1992. - p. 8.
 Скальковський А. О. Історія Нової Ciчi або останнього Коша Запороэького. -Дніпропетровськ, 1994. - p. 192.
 Apxiв Коша Нової Запорозької Ciчi. Опис справ. 1713-1776. - К., 1994. - С. 77.
 Боровий С. А. Євреї в Запорозькій Ciчi. //Праці Інституту єврейської культури ВУАН. - К., 1930.

Zaporozhian Host
Jewish Ukrainian history
Jews and Judaism in the Russian Empire
Cossack military units and formations